The 1981–82 Tampa Bay Rowdies indoor season was the eighth indoor season of the club's existence.

Overview
As in previous years, all home games were played at the Bayfront Center in St. Petersburg, Florida. Tampa Bay entered their eighth indoor season looking for redemption, after the 1980–81 indoor team was the first in club history to miss the playoffs. The club had several noteworthy changes occur in the lead-up to the 1981–82 indoor campaign.

Just as the team's 1981 outdoor playoff run was ending the Rowdies announced a partnership with Brazilian giants São Paulo FC. The agreement would allow the Rowdies to sign up to three loan players during São Paulo’s off season, as well as allowing Tampa Bay’s young players to train with the Brazilian club’s reserve squad.

Less than two weeks later on September 16, a press conference was held announcing that the Dallas Tornado were merging with Tampa Bay. The Dallas owners would become minority owners of the Florida club. For their part, the Rowdies gained the number one overall pick in the upcoming amateur draft, and their choice of players from the Dallas roster. Ultimately they added four, and sold the rest to various NASL, ASL, and MISL
clubs.

Just prior to the start of the indoor season Mike Connell was named team captain. He had served as acting captain since May, after Jan van der Veen was traded to California during the 1981 outdoor season. Two noteworthy young players made their Rowdie debuts in December at the beginning of the indoor season. Hugo Pérez, a future U.S. Hall of Famer, who had just turned 18 a few weeks earlier, scored five goals in his first two indoor matches. Not to be outdone, a 19-year-old São Paulo loaner, nicknamed Tatu, scored a hattrick to kick off what would become a legendary 21-year indoor career.

For the team as a whole the 18-game regular season got of to a slow 1–3 start. Things began to pick up after Tatu’s arrival on match-day five. The Rowdies made it into the playoffs in large part by winning seven of their last nine matches. They were edged out for the division title by Chicago on the last day of the regular season, in an overtime thriller in front of a then-record indoor crowd of 19,938 at Chicago Stadium.

Tampa Bay ended the regular season with an 11–7 record and placed second in the Central Division, qualifying them for the playoffs. Rookie sensation Tatu led the club with 21 goals, while Zequinha was the team’s points and assists leader with 60 and 22 respectively.

In the playoffs, after exciting first and second round series wins against Montreal and Tulsa. the Rowdies returned to the finals. The indoor finals were a passing of the torch from the Rowdies to the San Diego Sockers. Tampa Bay had been arguably the most successful NASL indoor team up to that point, but in the finals the Rowdies were swept by San Diego in convincing fashion. In doing so, the Sockers would start a dominant, decade-long run, winning titles in 10 of the next 11 NASL indoor and MISL seasons they participated in.

Shortly after the playoffs the Rowdies learned that they had placed three players on the 1981–82 all-star team first squad, and one more on the second team.

Club

Roster 
# on injured reserve all season

Management and technical staff 
 George W. Strawbridge, Jr., owner
 Chas Serednesky, Jr., president
 Francisco Marcos, director of player personal 
 Gordon Jago, head coach 
 Kevin Keelan, assistant coach
 Ken Shields, trainer
 Alfredo Beronda, equipment manager 
 Dr. Andrew Boyer, team physician

Honors
NASL Atlantic Conference: 1981–82 Champions
NASL Indoor: 1981–82 runners-up

Individual honors
Four Rowdies received individual honors following the 1981–82 NASL indoor season.

Atlantic Conference All-Star, First Team: Tatu
Atlantic Conference All-Star, First Team: Mike Connell
Atlantic Conference All-Star, First Team: Jürgen Stars
Atlantic Conference All-Star, Second Team: John Gorman

Preseason friendlies 
Tampa Bay played one preseason exhibition match on December 2 against the Jacksonville Tea Men, winning, 9–2.

Preseason results

Regular season

Final division standings 
W = Wins, L = Losses, GB = Games behind 1st place, % = Winning percentage, GF = Goals for, GA = Goals against

Results

Playoffs 
The playoffs are a home and home series. If one team fails to win both games, then a non-sudden-death, 15-minute mini-game is played, with a brief halftime to changes ends of the field. If the mini-game remains tied after full-time, then the match moves to sudden-death overtime periods, each lasting 7:30.

Bracket

Results

Statistics

Season scoring
GP = Games Played, G = Goals (worth 2 points), A = Assists (worth 1 point), Pts = Points

Season goalkeeping
Note: GP = Games played; Min = Minutes played; GA = Goals against; GAA = Goals against average; W = Wins; L = Losses

Playoff scoring
GP = Games Played, G = Goals (worth 2 points), A = Assists (worth 1 point), Pts = Points

Playoff goalkeeping
Note: GP = Games played; MGP = Mini-games played; Min = Minutes played; GA = Goals against; GAA = Goals against average; W = Wins; L = Losses

Player movement

In

Out

See also
 1981–82 NASL Indoor season
 1982 in American soccer
 Tampa Bay Rowdies (1975–1993)

References

External links
 1981–82 Rowdies stats
 1982 in American Soccer 

Tampa Bay Rowdies
1981–82 indoor
Tampa Bay Rowdies (1975–1993) seasons
Tampa Bay Rowdies
Tampa Bay Rowdies
Tampa
Sports in St. Petersburg, Florida